Ksenja Povh is a Slovenian footballer currently playing as a midfielder for Krka Novo Mesto in the 1.SŽNL. She has also played for Vamos Idaliou in the Cypriot First Division.

She was a member of the Slovenian national team in the 2011 World Cup qualifying campaign.

Titles
 6 Slovenian Leagues (2004, 2005, 2007, 2008, 2009, 2011)
 4 Slovenian Cups (2004, 2006, 2008, 2009)

References

External links
 

1987 births
Living people
Slovenian women's footballers
Expatriate footballers in Cyprus
Slovenia women's international footballers
Sportspeople from Novo Mesto
Women's association football defenders
Women's association football midfielders
ŽNK Krka players